Casc1, alias Las1, is one of the six genes constituting the mouse Pulmonary adenoma susceptibility 1 (Pas1) locus haplotype. Cancer susceptibility 1 is a protein that in humans is encoded by the CASC1 gene.

References

Further reading